Acompsia tenebrosella is a moth of the family Gelechiidae. It is found in Morocco. The species was described from a single male. The species probably does not belong in the genus Acompsia.

References

Moths described in 1955
Acompsia
Moths of Africa